La presidentessa (The Chairwoman) is a 1977 Italian comedy film directed by Luciano Salce.

It is based on the play Madame Presidente by Maurice Hennequin and Pierre Veber.

Cast 
Mariangela Melato as Yvette Jolifleur
Johnny Dorelli as Tony Beghin/Ottavio
Vittorio Caprioli as Mazzone
Gianrico Tedeschi as Judge Agostino Trecanti
Luciano Salce as Bortignon
Elsa Vazzoler as Egle Trecanti
Marco Tulli as Salvatore
Ugo Bologna as Notary Piovano
Renzo Marignano as Scottish Tourist

See also
 List of Italian films of 1977
Madame la Presidente (1916)
Mademoiselle Gobete (1952)

References

External links

La presidentessa at Variety Distribution

1977 films
Italian comedy films
1977 comedy films
Films directed by Luciano Salce
Remakes of Italian films
Italian films based on plays
Films set in Veneto
Films set in Rome
1970s Italian films
1970s Italian-language films